The women's 63 kg judo competitions at the 2022 Commonwealth Games in Birmingham, England took place on August 2nd at the Coventry Arena. A total of nine competitors from nine nations took part.

Results
The draw is as follows:

Repechages

References

External link
 
 Results
 

W63
2022
Commonwealth W63